Forbidden Love (lit. Tale of the Nine-Tailed Fox) is a 2004 South Korean television series starring Kim Tae-hee, Jo Hyun-jae and Jun Jin. It aired on KBS2 from July 19 to September 7, 2004 on Mondays and Tuesdays at 21:50 for 16 episodes.

The story is about a rare fox race whose appearance is that of humans. They survive by eating dead human livers. The drama revolves around conflicts between being a fox warrior and loving a human being.

Plot
Yoon Shi-yeon (Kim Tae-hee) is a "gumiho" (or nine-tailed fox) living undercover in the human world. She has a dark past when her whole family was massacred, leaving her an orphan. By day, Shi-yeon is an employee at a natural history museum. By night, she's a top-ranking woman warrior in the Nine-Tailed Fox clan, charged with preserving the delicate balance between man and fox. But her world is sent spinning when an atrocious serial murder, where the victims have had their internal organs gouged out is uncovered. Detective Kang Min-woo (Jo Hyun-jae) believes the murders may relate to the organ trafficking trade, and goes undercover in a seedy organ smuggling ring. But Min-woo's cover is blown, and it's only through the intervention of Shi-yeon and Nine-Tailed Fox warrior Moo-young (Jun Jin) that he's able to survive. But now he's seen their true identities as Nine-Tailed Foxes.

Cast
 Kim Tae-hee as Yoon Shi-yeon
 Jo Hyun-jae as Inspector Kang Min-woo
 Jun Jin as Moo-young
 Han Ye-seul as Chae-yi
 Park Joon-seok as Rang
 Uhm Tae-woong as Sa-joon
 Lee Hwi-hyang as Senator Shin Soo-jang
 Dokgo Young-jae as Bureau chief Jang
 Kwon Hae-hyo as Detective Moon
 Jung Kook-jin as K
 Lee Sang-in as Kim Young-mo
 Kim Ji-woo as Kang Min-joo, Min-woo's sister
 Kim Ye-ryeong as Kang Joo-sun
 Seo Yoo-jung as Jung Se-kyung
 Kim Hak-chul as Nam Joon-woo
 Kim Ye-jin
 Sunwoo Sun
 Seo Yeon-joo

Awards
 2004 KBS Drama Awards: Best New Actress - Kim Tae-hee

References

External links
 Forbidden Love official KBS website 
 
 

Korean Broadcasting System television dramas
2004 South Korean television series debuts
2004 South Korean television series endings
South Korean fantasy television series
South Korean action television series
Television series by Pan Entertainment